Capital A Berhad, operating as AirAsia (stylized as airasia) is a Malaysian multinational low-cost airline headquartered near Kuala Lumpur, Malaysia. It is the largest airline in Malaysia by fleet size and destinations. AirAsia operates scheduled domestic and international flights to more than 165 destinations spanning 25 countries. Its main base is klia2, the low-cost carrier terminal at Kuala Lumpur International Airport (KLIA) in Sepang, Selangor, Malaysia. Its affiliate airlines AirAsia Cambodia, Thai AirAsia, Indonesia AirAsia, and Philippines AirAsia have bases in Phnom Penh, Bangkok–Don Mueang, Jakarta–Soekarno-Hatta, and Manila–Ninoy Aquino airports respectively, while its sister airline, AirAsia X, focuses on long-haul routes. AirAsia's registered office and head office is at Kuala Lumpur International Airport.

In 2007, The New York Times described the airline as a "pioneer" of low-cost travel in Asia. It has also consistently been named as the world's best low-cost carrier for 13 years by Skytrax in a row in international travel and airline awards, including the latest award for 2022.

AirAsia is the sponsor of Malaysia national football team, Singapore national football team, Jamshedpur FC and Queens Park Rangers. AirAsia is also a former sponsor of Manchester United and the Asia leg of Taylor Swift's Red Tour.

History

Foundation (1993–2005)
AirAsia was established as a full-service airline in 1993 and began operations on 18 November 1996. It was founded by a government-owned conglomerate, DRB-HICOM. On 5 September 2001, the heavily indebted airline was bought by former Time Warner (now known as WarnerMedia) executive Tony Fernandes and Kamarudin Meranun's company Tune Air Sdn Bhd for the token sum of one ringgit (about US$ at the time) with MYR 40 million (US$) worth of debts. Tune Air officially took over AirAsia on 8 December 2001. The partners turned the company around, and AirAsia subsequently announced a rebrand and relaunch on 15 January 2002 as a low-cost airline. It produced a profit in 2002 and launched new routes from its hub in Kuala Lumpur, undercutting former monopoly operator Malaysia Airlines with promotional fares as low as MYR 10 (US$). In 2003, AirAsia opened a second hub at Senai International Airport in Johor Bahru. International flights to Phuket and Bangkok were launched in December 2003 and February 2004, respectively.

AirAsia subsequently started its Thai AirAsia affiliate and began flights to Singapore and Indonesia. Flights to Macau started in June 2004, and flights to mainland China (Xiamen) and the Philippines (Manila) in April 2005. Flights to Vietnam and Cambodia followed in 2005 and to Brunei and Myanmar in 2006, the latter by Thai AirAsia. AirAsia launched its Indonesian affiliate Indonesia AirAsia, formerly known as Awair, in 2005. In August 2006, AirAsia took over Malaysia Airlines's Rural Air Service routes in Sabah and Sarawak, operating under the FlyAsianXpress brand. The routes were returned to MASwings a year later, citing commercial reasons.

Expansion (2006–present)
At the end of 2006, Fernandes unveiled a five-year plan to further enhance AirAsia's presence in Asia. Under the plan, AirAsia proposed enhancing its route network by connecting all of its existing destinations throughout the region and expanding further into Vietnam, Indonesia, Southern China (Kunming, Xiamen, Shenzhen) and India. Through its sister companies, Thai AirAsia and Indonesia AirAsia, the plan called for a focus on developing its hubs in Bangkok and Jakarta. With increased frequency and the addition of new routes, AirAsia carried 13.9 million passengers in 2007, an improvement over the 5.7 million passengers it carried in 2006.

In August 2011, AirAsia agreed to form an alliance with Malaysia Airlines by means of a share swap. This would have reduced competition and help the Malaysian flag carrier return to profitability. However, the deal was terminated in 2012.

AirAsia would continue its regional expansion in Asia, launching its affiliates Philippines AirAsia in 2012 and AirAsia India in 2014. In 2017, it planned to set up a new affiliate in China but failed. Plans were also made since 2005 to enter the Vietnam market by establishing an affiliate airline of its own there; however, after four attempts, AirAsia terminated its plan to set up its own airline in Vietnam.

AirAsia suspended its operations in March 2020 due to the COVID-19 pandemic. It later resumed domestic operations in April 2020, followed by its affiliates soon after. In October 2021, AirAsia restarted international flights after the Malaysian government lifted travel restrictions.

On 3 January 2022, AirAsia proposed its corporate name change to Capital A, which subject to shareholders' approval. The proposed name has been approved by the Companies Commission of Malaysia (SSM) and reserved by the company on 28 December 2021. On 28 January 2022, the company changed its corporate name from AirAsia Group Bhd to Capital A Bhd to reflect the expansion of its business portfolio beyond the core budget airline. However, its airline business continued to use the AirAsia brand.

Corporate affairs

The head office is the Red Quarters (RedQ) at Kuala Lumpur International Airport in Sepang, Selangor. This facility also serves as the company's registered office.

The airline has moved its head office to a new , RM140mil facility constructed at klia2 on 7 November 2016. Until the new head office opened, the airline's head office was located in the KLIA LCCT. The new klia2 head office has been scheduled to open at the end of 2015. The former registered office was on level 13 of the Menara Prima Tower B in Petaling Jaya.

RedQ is scheduled to hold about 2,000 AirAsia and AirAsia X employees. Aireen Omar, the AirAsia Country CEO of Malaysia, stated that the headquarters needed to be redesigned because in the klia2 plans the location of the control tower had been changed. Construction on the facility was scheduled to begin in July 2014. Malaysia Airports Holdings is leasing the land that will be occupied by the headquarters. An AirAsia X flight attendant gave the building the name "RedQuarters" or "RedQ", and its groundbreaking ceremony was held in November 2014.

Business highlights

Notes
AirAsia changed its financial year from 31 March to 30 June in 2002. It was changed again to the current 31 December in 2007.
The 2006–07 fiscal year spans the period from 1 July 2006 to 31 December 2007, though their annual reports indicate two separate periods (including a six-month period in 2007) for that fiscal year.
The financial highlights table only includes figures from the Capital A Consolidated Airlines Group consisting of its main affiliate in Malaysia, and sub-affiliates Indonesia AirAsia and Philippines AirAsia.

Affiliate airlines

AirAsia Cambodia

In May 2017, AirAsia planned to open a subsidiary company in Cambodia to handle an increase of tourists from Malaysia visiting to the Cambodian cities of Phnom Penh, Siem Reap and Sihanoukville. On 9 December 2022, AirAsia and Sivilai Asia signed a joint venture agreement to establish AirAsia Cambodia, with AirAsia owning majority of the airline. The airline is planned to commence operations in late 2023.

AirAsia India

AirAsia India is the Indian affiliate of AirAsia. The airline was announced as a joint venture between AirAsia, Arun Bhatia, and Tata Sons on 19 February 2013. It commenced operations on 12 June 2014. The airline is headquartered in Chennai, with its primary hub at Kempegowda International Airport, Bangalore.

In November 2020, AirAsia reviewing its India operations run in partnership with Tata Sons signalling a possible exit from the country. The airline was later sold to Tata Sons in 2022, making it a wholly-owned subsidiary of Air India Limited. The airline is set to be merged into Air India Express by 2023.

AirAsia Japan

AirAsia Japan was the Japanese low-cost airline affiliate of AirAsia based in Nagoya and formerly in Narita. The airline was first announced as a joint venture between AirAsia and All Nippon Airways in 2011. It flew its first flight in August 2012. The joint venture was terminated in June 2013, which led to the airline ceasing operations on 27 October 2013.

A relaunch of AirAsia Japan was announced in 2014. It recommenced operations on 29 October 2017, but due to low passenger demand caused by COVID-19 pandemic, it ceased operations on 5 October 2020.

AirAsia X

AirAsia X is the long-haul operation of AirAsia. The franchise is able to keep costs down by using a universal ticketing system. AirAsia X is also affiliated with Virgin Group and Air Canada. On 17 May 2007, Tony Fernandes announced plans to commence flights from Malaysia to Australia. Fernandes said he would be avoiding Sydney Airport due to its high fees. Instead, the airline would concentrate on cheaper alternatives such as Melbourne's Avalon Airport, Williamtown Airport in Newcastle, and Adelaide Airport. Sustained fares were predicted to be around MYR 800 (A$285) for a return fare, plus taxes. Interest was also expressed in using Gold Coast Airport as another Australian destination. AirAsia X began operations on 2 November 2007, with its first flight from Kuala Lumpur to Gold Coast.

Indonesia AirAsia & Indonesia AirAsia X

Indonesia AirAsia serves as the Indonesian affiliate of AirAsia, It operates scheduled domestic and international flights from Indonesia, with its main base at Soekarno-Hatta International Airport, Jakarta. The airline was established as Awair in 1999 by Abdurrahman Wahid, former chairman of the Nahdlatul Ulama Muslim organisation. He had a 40% stake in the airline which he relinquished after being elected president of Indonesia in October 1999. On 1 December 2005, Awair changed its name to Indonesia AirAsia in line with the other AirAsia branded airlines in the region. AirAsia Berhad has a 49% share in the airline with Fersindo Nusaperkasa owning 51%. Indonesia's laws disallow a foreign-majority ownership on domestic civil aviation operations.

Indonesia AirAsia X is a joint venture of AirAsia X. It serves Indonesia AirAsia's regularly scheduled long haul international flights from Bali's Ngurah Rai International Airport. Indonesia AirAsia X launched its first flight to Taipei on 29 January 2015. It ceased scheduled operations in January 2019.

Philippines AirAsia

Philippines AirAsia is a joint venture between Filipino investors and AirAsia. The Filipino group include Antonio Cojuangco, Jr., Yancy Mckhel Mejia, former owner of Associated Broadcasting Company with flagship television station TV5, Michael Romero, a real estate developer and port operator, and Marianne Hontiveros. The airline is 60% owned by the Filipino investors and the remaining 40% is owned by AirAsia. The airline was launched on 16 December 2010 and commenced operations on 28 March 2012.

In 2013, it partnered with Zest Airways, a Philippine low-cost airline. It operates scheduled domestic and international tourist services, mainly feeder services linking Manila and Cebu with 24 domestic destinations in support of the trunk route operations of other airlines. Less than a year after AirAsia and Zest Air's strategic alliance, Zest Airways was rebranded as AirAsia Zest on 21 September 2013. It merged with Philippines AirAsia in 2015.

Thai AirAsia & Thai AirAsia X

Thai AirAsia is a joint venture between AirAsia and Thailand's Asia Aviation. It serves AirAsia's regularly scheduled domestic and international flights from Bangkok and other cities in Thailand. Prior to 2016, Thai AirAsia was 55% owned by Asia Aviation and 45% owned by AirAsia International. King Power acquired 39% of Asia Aviation in 2016. The airline sponsors the Thai football teams Buriram United, SCG Muangthong United, Chonburi, Osotspa Saraburi, BEC Tero Sasana, Chiangrai UTD, Esan United, Chainat, Samut Prakan CUTD, Bangkok United, FC Phuket, Krabi, Air Force United, Nakhon Phanom, Loei City, Trang and the referee of Football Association of Thailand.

Thai AirAsia X is Thailand's first long-haul low-cost airline. It was scheduled to begin operations in June 2014. After putting off the launch that had been planned for the first quarter, Thai AirAsia X was to launch its maiden service from Bangkok to Incheon, South Korea on 17 June and then begin regular flights to Japan's Narita Airport in Tokyo and Osaka around July.

In May 2022, AirAsia announced the introduction of its ride-hailing service in Thailand, AirAsia Ride. Thailand is the second country AirAsia is expanding the e-hailing services in, directly competing with the dominant player, Grab.

Destinations

The AirAsia Group operates flights to 165 destinations in 25 countries worldwide. 24 of its destinations are its bases, with Kuala Lumpur International Airport being the largest base of the group.

Fleet

Current fleet
, the AirAsia fleet (Malaysia edition) consists of the following aircraft:

Fleet renewal and development
Previously operating the Boeing 737-300, AirAsia has now completely converted to the Airbus A320 family.

In June 2011, AirAsia ordered 200 Airbus A320neos at the Paris Air Show. The planes were originally due to become available in 2015, and the deal was one of the largest ever for commercial aircraft in a single order. The deal was worth US$18 billion at list prices, although AirAsia will have obtained a substantial discount from those prices. The deal makes AirAsia Airbus' single biggest customer. On 13 December 2012, AirAsia placed an order for an additional 100 Airbus A320 jets, splitting it between 64 A320neo and 36 A320ceo.
At the Farnborough International Air Show in 2016, Air Asia ordered 100 A321neos at an estimated cost of US$12.6 Billion dollars at list prices. Air Asia plans to fly these larger aircraft to airports that have infrastructure constraints. AirAsia received its first A320neo in September 2016. At the 2019 Farnborough Air Show, AirAsia further increased its orders for A320 aircraft, in the process also becoming Airbus' largest customer for the A321neo variant.

With this, the total number of orders that AirAsia had placed for the Airbus A320 family climbed to 592, reaffirming the carrier's position also as the largest airline customer for the Airbus single aisle product line. However, as a consequence of the COVID-19 pandemic on aviation, the orders for the new A320 family of aircraft were reworked by mutual agreement between AirAsia and Airbus in October 2021, with deliveries now scheduled to extend to 2035, among other undisclosed changes in purchase terms.

Former fleet

AirAsia formerly operated the following aircraft:

Services

On board

AirAsia offers "Santan" menu, with options to buy on board offering food, drinks, merchandise and duty free for purchase. Pre-purchase of "Santan" meals is available at a lower price than on board, and with additional options  AirAsia is accredited by the KL Syariah Index of Bursa Malaysia, and in accordance with Shariah principles, it does not serve alcohol or pork. However, this applies only to the regional AirAsia group flights, and not to the AirAsia X flights, which do sell wine and beer on board.

Frequent-flyer program
AirAsia is taking the first steps towards starting its own frequent-flyer programme. The airline has signed an agreement to start a joint venture with financial services firm Tune Money to launch a programme called "BIG". Under this programme, it will issue loyalty points to AirAsia customers and third-party merchants. Points can then be used to redeem AirAsia flights.

Awards and recognitions
 Skytrax World's Best Low-Cost Airline (2009–present)
 World Travel Awards World's Leading Low-Cost Airline (2013–present)
 World Travel Awards World's Leading Low-Cost Airline Cabin Crew (2017–present)
 World Travel Awards Asia's Leading Low-Cost Airline (2016–present)
 World Travel Awards Asia's Leading Low-Cost Airline (2017–present)

Criticism and controversy

Barisan Nasional-themed flight 
Before the 2018 Malaysian general election, AirAsia received criticism for seemingly backing Najib Razak and his Barisan Nasional coalition, a move seen as politically incorrect by some political commentators. Najib was seen returning from Sabah to Kuala Lumpur after a campaign trip on an AirAsia flight together with AirAsia CEO Tony Fernandes. The aeroplane that Najib flew was draped in the blue of BN with the air stewardesses dressed in that same blue, instead of the typical AirAsia red. The words “Hebatkan Negaraku” (English: “Make my country greater”) can also be seen across the fuselage of the aeroplane. After Najib was defeated in the general election, Tony Fernandes issued an apology, claiming that he had buckled under the intense pressure from Najib's government.

Other controversies and issues
In 2007, passengers from "The Barrier-Free Environment and Accessible Transport Group" protested against the airline over its refusal to fly passengers who were completely immobile. They claimed that people with disabilities were discriminated against when booking tickets online; the CEO of the airline said it did not turn away passengers in wheelchairs.

In 2018, Philippines AirAsia, one of its affiliates, was named as one of the world's least punctual airlines based on 2017 data from OAG.

Incidents and accidents 

 10 January 2011: AirAsia Flight 5218, an Airbus A320-216 (9M-AHH), skidded to the right and went off the side of the runway at Kuching Airport, Malaysia. It came to rest in the grass with the nose gear dug in and collapsed. All 123 passengers and six crew members survived. The plane received heavy damage but was eventually repaired.

See also
 List of airlines of Malaysia
 List of airports in Malaysia
 Transport in Malaysia

References

External links

 

 
Airlines of Malaysia
Malaysian brands
Airlines established in 1993
Malaysian companies established in 1993
1993 establishments in Malaysia
Low-cost carriers
Companies based in Sepang
Companies listed on Bursa Malaysia
Tune Group